The Ninth Doctor Adventures, announced in August 2020, is a Big Finish Productions audio play series based on the television series Doctor Who. It sees the return of Christopher Eccleston reprising his role as the Ninth Doctor and will span four boxsets comprising an entire audio season to be released between May 2021 and February 2022. A second audio season of four more boxsets followed in 2022 and 2023; a third audio season of four followed in 2023 and 2024.

History 
The Ninth Doctor, as portrayed by actor Christopher Eccleston, first appeared in 2005 for the relaunch of Doctor Who. Eccleston is notable for portraying The Doctor for one series before departing. Since, Eccleston had vowed never to return to the science fiction series, even declining to portray the character in the fiftieth anniversary special "The Day of the Doctor" due to his feelings that the story "didn't do the character any justice" and felt the BBC still owed him an apology.

In 2018 the actor stated about his exit, “What happened around Doctor Who almost destroyed my career... I gave them a hit show and I left with dignity and then they put me on a blacklist. I was carrying my own insecurities as it was something I had never done before and then I was abandoned, vilified in the tabloid press and blacklisted.”

As of August 2020, Eccleston, having felt healed from meeting fans at conventions and their feelings towards his portrayal of The Doctor, ultimately agreed to participate with Big Finish after discussions with Big Finish co-chairman, Jason Haigh-Ellery. Eccleston, in response to his return, stated  “After 15 years, it will be exciting to revisit the Ninth Doctor’s world, bringing back to life a character I love playing.”

A second season was announced on 13 September 2021. Subsequently, a third season was announced on 9 March 2023.

Production 
Nicholas Briggs revealed that he would direct some episodes of the series and that other directors would also be involved. He also revealed he has written a story but was not sure if the BBC would accept it. Christopher Eccleston posted a picture on Instagram showing him holding the script, which revealed title of the first episode, Sphere of Freedom, and writer Nicholas Briggs.

Cast

Main Cast

Guests

Series 1 

 Ben Lee as Farraday (Sphere Of Freedom / Cataclysm / Food Fight)
 Jamie Parker as Halloran (Sphere Of Freedom / Cataclysm / Food Fight)
 Dan Starkey as Marcus Aurelius Gallius (Sphere Of Freedom / Cataclysm / Food Fight)
 Claire Corbett as Ravager (Cataclysm / Food Fight)
 Anjella MacKintosh as AI / President / Café Owner (Cataclysm / Food Fight)
 Pearl Appleby as DC Jana Lee (Girl, Deconstructed)
 Mirren Mack as Marnie / The Serapheem  (Girl, Deconstructed)
 Forbes Masson as Kurt  (Girl, Deconstructed)
 Damian Lynch as Artie Berger (Fright Motif)
 Gemma Whelan as Zazie Vincent (Fright Motif)
 Adrian Schiller as Maurice Le Bon (Fright Motif)
 Jan Francis as First Incorporation (Planet of the End)
 Nick Fletcher as Second Incorporation (Planet of the End)
 Annette Badland as Mrs Goose / Fleshkin 3 (The Hunting Season)
 Don Gilét as Streatham / Fleshkin 2 (The Hunting Season)
 Alex Jennings as Lord Hawthorn (The Hunting Season)
 Anthony Howell as Macbeth / Siward (The Curse of Lady Macbeth)
 Neve McIntosh as Gruach (The Curse of Lady Macbeth)
 David Rintoul as Kinade / Priest / Bishop (The Curse of Lady Macbeth)
 Peter Bankolé as Dieter Jovanovic (Monsters In Metropolis)
 Nick Wilton as Fritz Lang (Monsters In Metropolis)
 Helen Goldwyn as Anna Dreyfus (Monsters In Metropolis)
 Raj Ghatak as Olaf Richter (Monsters In Metropolis)
 Sienna Guillory as Idara Beckett (Fond Farewell)
 Juliet Stevenson as Winifred Whitby (Fond Farewell)

Series 2 

Indigo Griffths as Saffron Windrose (Station to Station)
Ian Bartholemew as The Grimminy-Grue (Station to Station)
Katy Brittain as Oksana Vladmirovna Kuznetsova (The False Dimitry)
Leah Brotherhead as Mandy Litherland (Auld Lang Syne)
Wendy Craig as Great Aunt Bette (Auld Lang Syne)
Hayley Tamaddon as Auntie Sue (Auld Lang Syne)
Dan Starkey as Sontarans (Salvation Nine)
Josie Lawrence as Gaznak (Salvation Nine)
Pooja Shah as Navarch Al-Hanin (Salvation Nine)
Nicolas Colicos as Succeeding / Robot (Last of the Zetacene)
Alice Feetham as Nel (Last of the Zetacene)
Maureen O'Brien as Selo / First Gyra (Last of the Zetacene)
Simon Shepherd as Pal Andrews (Break the Ice)
Thalissa Teixeira as Dr Lenni Fisk (Break the Ice)
Pip Torrens as Kenton (Break the Ice)
Sasha Behar as Diana Hendry (The Seas Of Titan)
Yasmin Mwanza as Rachel Bates / Taroth (The Seas Of Titan)
Ferdy Roberts as Soloman Read (The Seas Of Titan)
Joseph Kloska as Ludwig Von Husseldorf (Lay Down Your Arms)
Jamie Parker as Tsar Alexander II / Trinity (Lay Down Your Arms)
Diana Quick as Sophie Kinzky (Lay Down Your Arms)
Kate Sissons as Bertha Kinzky (Lay Down Your Arms)
Jeremy Swift as Fraser / Colleague One (Flatpack)
Frank Skinner as Pete Snow (The Colour of Terror)
Dave Hearn as Toby Entwhistle (The Blooming Menace)
Adam Martyn as Callen Lennox (Red Darkness)
Harki Bhambra as Doyle (Red Darkness)

Episodes

Series 1 (2021–22)

Series 2 (2022–23)

Series 3

Awards and nominations

References

Audio plays based on Doctor Who
Big Finish Productions
Doctor Who spin-offs
Ninth Doctor audio plays